Baeonoma leucodelta is a moth in the family Depressariidae. It was described by Edward Meyrick in 1914. It is found in Guyana and Pará, Brazil.

The wingspan is about 7 mm. The forewings are dark fuscous, with a slight purplish gloss and with a triangular white blotch extending on the dorsum from beyond the middle to near the tornus, and reaching half across the wing. There is a smaller white apical patch, its edge running from five-sixths of the costa to the termen above the middle. The hindwings are rather dark grey.

References

Moths described in 1914
Baeonoma
Moths of South America
Taxa named by Edward Meyrick